Baiomys is the genus of New World pygmy mice.  Together with Scotinomys, it forms the tribe Baiomyini.  It currently contains two extant species:

Southern pygmy mouse, Baiomys musculus
Northern pygmy mouse, Baiomys taylori

References

Amman, B R., R. D. Bradley. 2003. Molecular evolution in Baiomys (Rodentia: Sigmodontinae): Evidence for a genetic subdivision in B. musculus. Journal of Mammalogy 85:162-166.
Integrated Taxonomic Information System . Retrieved 3 April 2007.

 
Rodent genera
Taxa named by Frederick W. True